Élisabeth Vonarburg (born 5 August 1947) is a science fiction writer.  She was born in Paris (France) and has lived in Chicoutimi (now Saguenay), Quebec, Canada since 1973.

From 1979 to 1990 she was the literary director of the French-Canadian science fiction magazine Solaris. Her first novel, Le Silence de la Cité (The Silence in the City), appeared in 1981.

She has received several awards, including "Le Grand Prix de la SF française" in 1982 and a Philip K. Dick Award special citation in 1992 for In the Mothers' Land the English version of Chroniques du pays des mères.

She is the author of Cycle de Tyranaël.

Bibliography

Series

Maerlande

Tyranaël

Reine de Mémoire

Les Pierres et les Roses

Other Novels and Story Collections

External links

 "Dreams of the Real: Dreams of the Sea by Elisabeth Vonarburg", by John Garrison, Strange Horizons, 28 June 2004
 

1947 births
Living people
Writers from Paris
Canadian science fiction writers
Canadian speculative fiction critics
Canadian speculative fiction editors
French science fiction writers
Writers from Saguenay, Quebec
Science fiction critics
French emigrants to Quebec
Canadian women novelists
Women science fiction and fantasy writers
French women novelists
Canadian novelists in French
Canadian women non-fiction writers
Université Laval alumni